William F. Storrar is a Scottish Christian theologian who is the Director of Center of Theological Inquiry, known for his contribution on public theology.

Biography
He obtained his Doctor of Philosophy degree in practical theology at New College, University of Edinburgh, in 1993. He was ordained a minister in the Church of Scotland in 1984 and has served as a parish minister in Glasgow and Carluke for eight years.

In 1992, he started working as a lecturer in practical theology at the University of Aberdeen, followed by being a senior lecturer at the University of Glasgow in 1998. In 2000, he was appointed Director of Centre for Theology and Public Issues and Chair of Christian Ethics and Practical Theology at New College and has worked until 2005. He was the co-founder of the Global Network for Public Theology. Since 2005, he has taken up the post of Director of the Center of Theological Inquiry.

He was at the editorial board of the International Journal of Public Theology and was the chair of Common Cause at the Church of Scotland in the 1990s.

Selected works
 Storrar, William (1982), No Room, No Birth, Some Magi, in Hearn, Sheila G. (ed.). Cencrastus No. 10, Autumn 1982, pp. 3–8, 
 Storrar, William (1990), Scottish Identity: A Christian Vision. Edinburgh: Handsel.

Edited works
 Storrar, William and Iain R. Torrance (1995). Human Genetics: A Christian Perspective. Edinburgh: St. Andrew Press.
 Storrar, William and Peter Donald (2003). God in Society: Doing Social Theology in Scotland Today. Edinburgh: Saint Andrew Press. 
 Storrar, William and Andrew Morton (2004). Public Theology for the 21st Century. T&T Clark. 
 Storrar, William, Peter J. Casarella and Paul Louis Metzger (2011). A World for All? Global Civil Society in Political Theory and Trinitarian Theology. Grand Rapids, MI: William B Eerdmans. 
 Storrar, William, Katie Day and Esther McIntosh (2013). Yours the Power: Faith-Based Organizing in the USA. Leiden: Brill.

References

20th-century Calvinist and Reformed theologians
20th-century Ministers of the Church of Scotland
20th-century Scottish theologians
21st-century Calvinist and Reformed theologians
21st-century Ministers of the Church of Scotland
21st-century Scottish theologians
Academics of the University of Aberdeen
Academics of the University of Edinburgh
Academics of the University of Glasgow
Alumni of the University of Edinburgh
Living people
Place of birth missing (living people)
Public theologians
Religion academics
Scottish Calvinist and Reformed theologians
Year of birth missing (living people)